Warsaw is the capital of Poland.

City of Warsaw may also refer to:
No. 316 Polish Fighter Squadron
The airplane flown by the Adamowicz brothers
City of Warsaw Library
Warsaw, Indiana